Zayden  is a variant of the male given name Aidan (name). The  popularity of Zayden as a baby name in the United States peaked in 2014 when it reached 188th. The name entered into usage over the late 1990s and early 2000s decade. It should not be confused with the etymologically-separate male given name Jayden, which means "he will judge," and is derived from the Biblical name Jadon the Meronothite.
 
Arabic meaning

Zayden (زيدان)  can also be an Arabic male name that means "growth" or "increase".  It can be written in various ways such as Zaydan and Zidan and is similar to the name Zayd, which shares the similar meaning of “abundance” or “plentiful”. It is both a given name and a surname in Arabic countries.

Given names
Irish masculine given names
Scottish masculine given names
Welsh masculine given names
English masculine given names
Arabic masculine given names